María Urrutia may refer to:
 María Isabel Urrutia (born 1965), weightlifter, athlete and politician from Colombia
 María José Urrutia (born 1993), Chilean footballer